Lilith Stangenberg (born 14 August 1988) is a German stage and film actress. For her performance as Ania in the 2016 film Wild she won the Preis der deutschen Filmkritik. She also won the 2020  for her stage performances.

Selected filmography

References

External links 

1988 births
Living people
German film actresses
German stage actresses